Caleb Santos Jordão Rocha Carvalho (born 9 November 1992), known simply as Caleb, is a Brazilian football player who plays for SC Olhanense.

Club career
He made his professional debut in the Campeonato Brasileiro Série A for América Mineiro on 23 July 2011 in a game against Figueirense.

References

External links

1992 births
Footballers from Belo Horizonte
Living people
Brazilian footballers
América Futebol Clube (MG) players
Nacional Esporte Clube (MG) players
Associação Desportiva São Caetano players
Criciúma Esporte Clube players
Resende Futebol Clube players
Louletano D.C. players
C.D. Fátima players
S.C. Olhanense players
Campeonato de Portugal (league) players
Brazilian expatriate footballers
Expatriate footballers in Portugal
Association football forwards